Kieran Quirke (born 198?) is a Gaelic footballer from Duagh, County Kerry, in Ireland.  He plays for the Duagh GAA club, Feale Rangers divisional side and Kerry senior football team.

Playing career

Club football
In 2006, Quirke won the Kerry Junior Football Championship with Duagh.   The team went on to emerge from Munster with Quirke playing a key part as they qualified for the All-Ireland Junior Club Football Championship final in 2007.  However, Greencastle GAA defeated them by one point in the final.

Quirke went on to win that year's Kerry Senior Football Championship with Feale Rangers as they beat South Kerry by a point in the final with Maher setting up a vital goal.

In 2012 he captained Duagh to a first North Kerry Championship title in 50 years.

Inter-county football

Quirke have played minor with Kerry and was only s sub with the Under 21 team. It was with the county junior team he was first noticed when he won a Munster championship in 2008 and later lost the All Ireland semi final. After a few years away from the team he was back in 2012 and won a second Munster title and later an All Ireland title.

He was a member for the Kerry senior panel in 2008 & 2009, playing 5 league games in 2009 and winning a medal as a member of the panel who beat Derry in the final. he also won an All Ireland title later on as a member of the panel.

Honours

Intercounty

 1 All Ireland Junior Championship
 2 Munster Junior Championship

Club

 1 County Senior Championship
 1 Munster Junior Club Championship
 1 County Junior Club Championship
 1 North Kerry Senior Championship

References

External links
Kerry GAA site
Feale Rangers site

Year of birth missing (living people)
1980s births
Living people
Duagh Gaelic footballers
Kerry inter-county Gaelic footballers